Charaxes virilis, the blue demon charaxes, is a butterfly in the family Nymphalidae. It is found in Guinea, Sierra Leone, Burkina Faso, Ivory Coast, Ghana, Nigeria, Cameroon, the Republic of the Congo, the Central African Republic, the Democratic Republic of the Congo and Uganda. The habitat consists of lowland evergreen forests and forest/savanna mosaic.

The larvae feed on Adenanthera pavonina, Griffonia simplicifolia, Cathormium, Dalbergia, Entada and Tetrapleura species.

Taxonomy
Charaxes virilis is a member of the large species group Charaxes etheocles.

Subspecies
C. v. virilis (Guinea, Sierra Leone, southern Burkina Faso. Ivory Coast, Ghana, Nigeria, Cameroon, Congo, Central African Republic, Democratic Republic of the Congo)
C. v. lenis Henning, 1989  (Uganda)

References

Victor Gurney Logan Van Someren, 1969 Revisional notes on African Charaxes (Lepidoptera: Nymphalidae). Part V. Bulletin of the British Museum (Natural History) (Entomology) 75-166.

External links
Images of C. virilis Royal Museum for Central Africa (Albertine Rift Project)
Ghana Butterflies images
Charaxes virilis images (Consortium for the Barcode of Life)
C. v. lena images BOLD
C. v. virilis images BOLD
C. v. virilis f. blandini images BOLD

Butterflies described in 1952
virilis